was a Japanese actor. In 1945, he signed a contract with Daiei Film company and started his acting career. Following year, he made his film debut with Okagura Kyōdai directed by Hiroshi Inagaki. At the same time, he was given the stage name Saburo Date by Inagaki. As the Daiei studio gave up film production in 1970, he left Daiei and became a freelance actor. He appeared in nearly 200 films between 1947 and 1990.

Selected filmography

 Okagura Kyōdai (1946)
 Story of a Beloved Wife (1951)
 Avalanche (1952)
 Ugetsu (1953)
 Gate of Hell (1953)
 Sansho the Bailiff (1954)
 The Crucified Lovers (1954)
 Enjō (1958)
 The Loyal 47 Ronin (1958)
 Tsukihime keizu (1958)
 Nichiren: A Man of Many Miracles (1958)
 The Tale of Zatoichi Continues (1962)
 Enter Kyōshirō Nemuri the Swordman (1963) as Zeniya
 Daimajin (1966)
 A Certain Killer (1967)
 Yokai Monsters: Along with Ghosts (1969)
 Hitokiri (1969)
 Lone Wolf and Cub: Sword of Vengeance (1972)
 Female Prisoner 701: Scorpion (1972)
 Lone Wolf and Cub: Baby Cart to Hades (1972)
 Karate Kiba (1973)
 Graveyard of Honor (1975)
 The Bullet Train (1975)
 Typhoon club (1985)
 Childhood Days'' (1990)

References

External links

1924 births
1991 deaths
Japanese male film actors
People from Osaka
20th-century Japanese male actors